Marquita Bradshaw (born January 19, 1974) is an American environmentalist, activist, and former political candidate. She was the Democratic nominee in the 2020 United States Senate election in Tennessee, the first African American woman to win a major political party nomination in any statewide race in Tennessee. She lost the general election to Republican Bill Hagerty. She is now the executive director of the environmental and political organization Sowing Justice.

Early life and education
Bradshaw was born and raised in Memphis, Tennessee.

During her childhood, her family was active in raising awareness of pollution leaking from the Memphis Defense Depot, a contaminated military base in a largely African American neighborhood of Memphis that became a Superfund site in 1992. Her parents organized a "concerned citizen committee" regarding the site because residents believed it was causing local health problems.

In addition to her activist parents, Bradshaw was influenced by her uncle John DeBerry, who was for many years a Democratic member of the Tennessee House of Representatives.

Bradshaw earned a Bachelor of Liberal Studies in journalism and communication studies from the University of Memphis.

Career 
She is the environmental justice chair of the Sierra Club's Tennessee chapter. According to the Chattanooga Times Free Press, "She has worked with community advocacy groups, environmental organizations and unions, including the Mid-South Peace and Justice Center, the AFL–CIO, the Sierra Club and Tennesseans for Fair Taxation."

2020 U.S. Senate election

In October 2019, Bradshaw announced her candidacy for the US Senate seat held by retiring Senator Lamar Alexander. She told the Nashville Scene, "What's going on in the Senate is that socially and economically, they don't represent what the constituents of Tennessee look like. The majority of Senate members are millionaires, and I'm a working-class single mother. There are other working-class people across Tennessee, and sometimes when those policies come down, they have unintended consequences that hurt working people." Bradshaw told the Tri-State Defender that "we are leading with environmental justice principles." She told other reporters from WPLN News that "People of color, black people, brown people, indigenous people and poor white people are not experiencing the same set of laws as everybody else when it comes to the environment." In addition to environmental issues, her platform endorsed Medicare for All and the Green New Deal. She also supports universal background checks for gun purchases, keeping the Deferred Action for Childhood Arrivals in force, and overturning Citizens United v. FEC.

In the Democratic primary, Bradshaw was one of five candidates, including the DSCC-supported Army veteran James Mackler. Mackler's campaign had raised $2.1 million, while Bradshaw's funding by March was less than $10,000. By the end of the primary campaign, Bradshaw had raised $24,000. The general expectation was that Mackler would easily win against a divided field with four other candidates.

On August 6, Bradshaw won, with 35.5% of the votes, while Mackler came in third with 23.8%. Bradshaw's decisive primary win was unexpected; the Associated Press called it "an astonishing upset victory over the Democratic establishment's choice" that "has drawn national attention." Bradshaw's win was the first successful challenge to any DSCC-backed candidate since 2010. Prior to Bradshaw's win in the primary, neither Tennessee Democrats nor Tennessee Republicans had ever chosen a Black woman as their candidate for statewide office. After her win in the primary, Bradshaw was congratulated, and later endorsed, by the Sunrise Movement. In September, she was endorsed by Elizabeth Warren, Pete Buttigieg, Bernie Sanders and the Sierra Club. Bradshaw pledged to visit every one of Tennessee's 95 counties to campaign for the general election.

She faced Republican nominee Bill Hagerty in the November 3, 2020, general election. Hagerty defeated Bradshaw, receiving 62% of the vote to Bradshaw's 35%, a result that Facing South attributed in part to Tennessee's restrictive voting laws and the failure of national organizations to help fund Bradshaw's campaign. (Kentucky Democrat Amy McGrath, with $90M funding as opposed to Bradshaw's $1.5M, lost to her opponent Mitch McConnell by a similar margin). Republicans have held both of Tennessee's Senate seats since 1994, when Republican Bill Frist defeated Democratic incumbent Jim Sasser.

Post-senate run
Following her unsuccessful senate bid, Bradshaw founded Sowing Justice, an organization striving to increase civic engagement and the cause of environmental justice.

In August 2021, a coalition of 466 environmentalist groups petitioned President Biden to replace Trump-appointed Neil Chatterjee as a member of the Federal Energy Regulatory Commission, naming Bradshaw as one of the three environmental justice activists they recommended. According to the petition, "We need a new FERC commissioner who will center science, justice, and equity, and end the era of dirty gas and other fossil fuels." According to Bradshaw, "We need a future in which the Federal Energy Regulatory Commission supports a just transition to be more effective and efficient, to eventually eliminate pollution as a byproduct of our energy sources and economy."

References

External links

Campaign website
Sowing Justice

"Let's Hold This Space Of Dissonance" by Marquita Bradshaw, Sierra Club of Tennessee.

1974 births
African-American women in politics
African-American people in Tennessee politics
American women environmentalists
Candidates in the 2020 United States Senate elections
Living people
Politicians from Memphis, Tennessee
Tennessee Democrats
University of Memphis alumni
21st-century American women
21st-century African-American women
21st-century African-American politicians
21st-century American politicians
20th-century African-American people
20th-century African-American women